Operation Tomahawk was an airborne military operation by the 187th Regimental Combat Team (187th RCT) on 23 March 1951 at Munsan-ni as part of Operation Courageous in the Korean War. Operation Courageous was designed to trap large numbers of Chinese People's Volunteer Army (PVA) and Korean People's Army (KPA) forces between the Han and Imjin Rivers north of Seoul, opposite the Republic of Korea Army (ROK) I Corps. The intent of Operation Courageous was for US I Corps, which was composed of the US 25th and 3rd Infantry Divisions and the ROK 1st Division, to advance quickly on the PVA/KPA positions and reach the Imjin River with all possible speed.

Operation Tomahawk was the other half of the plan. They did so, parachuting from over a hundred C-119 Flying Boxcar transport aircraft. When they landed they linked up with Task Force Growdon, which was made up of armored elements from the US 24th Infantry Division (United States)'s 6th Medium Tank Battalion and infantry elements from the US 3rd Infantry Division. The forces advanced to their goal, meeting weak resistance—mostly minefields—because the PVA/KPA had retreated before they got there.

One hundred twenty C-119s and C-46s dropped 3,437 paratroopers of the 187th RCT and 12 officers and men of the 60th Indian Parachute Field Ambulance (PFA) near Munsan-ni in the second largest airborne operation of the war. The 187th RCT suffered 4 fatalities (3 KIA and 1 in an accident).

References

External links
A period piece written by Time on 2 April 1951 at Again at the Parallel
The Korean War in March 1951
List of operations and code names in the Korean War
35th Infantry Regiment in Korea 

Battles and operations of the Korean War in 1951
1951 in South Korea 
Battles of the Korean War
Battles of the Korean War involving North Korea
Battles of the Korean War involving South Korea
Battles of the Korean War involving China
Battles of the Korean War involving India
Battles of the Korean War involving the Philippines
Battles of the Korean War involving the United States
Military operations of the Korean War
March 1951 events in Asia
Aerial operations and battles of the Korean War